Persoonia biglandulosa is a species of flowering plant in the family Proteaceae and is endemic to the south-west of Western Australia. It is an erect, spreading or low-lying shrub with smooth bark, linear leaves and bright yellow flowers in groups of between eight and twenty-five on the ends of branches.

Description

Taxonomy
Persoonia biglandulosa was first formally described in 1994 by Peter Weston in the journal Telopea from specimens he collected north of the Murchison River in 1980.

Distribution and habitat
This geebung grows in low heath on sandplains within  of the Murchison River in the south-west of Western Australia.

Conservation status
Persoonia biglandulosa is classified as "not threatened" by the Western Australian Government Department of Parks and Wildlife.

References

biglandulosa
Flora of Western Australia
Plants described in 1994
Taxa named by Peter H. Weston